William Trinke (January 25, 1897 – September 25, 1982) was an American lawyer and realtor from Lake Geneva, Wisconsin, and partner in the firm, Trinke and (John) Raup.

Trinke served in the United States Army in Europe during World War I. Ha was wounded in the hip. He received his bachelor's degree and law degrees from University of Wisconsin–Madison. He served in the Wisconsin State Senate from 1949 to 1959 as a Republican from Lake Geneva, Wisconsin.

Notes

1897 births
1982 deaths
People from Lake Geneva, Wisconsin
University of Wisconsin–Madison alumni
University of Wisconsin Law School alumni
Wisconsin lawyers
Republican Party Wisconsin state senators
20th-century American politicians
20th-century American lawyers